Andreas Diebitz (born January 11, 1965) is a German former footballer.

External links
Career stats

1965 births
Living people
German footballers
East German footballers
Dynamo Dresden players
Dynamo Dresden II players
FC Sachsen Leipzig players
Dresdner SC players
DDR-Oberliga players
Association football defenders
Bischofswerdaer FV 08 players